P. N. Sundaram (18 March 1934 – 22 March 2010) was an Indian cinematographer and director who worked in over 250 films in Tamil, Telugu, Kannada, Malayalam and Hindi film industries. Hailing from a lower middle class family, he struggled in his early years and started working early in life. He started his career as a camera assistant at Vijaya Vauhini Studios in the 1950s and later assisted A. Vincent in cinematography. He was one of the founding members of Film Employees Federation of South India and served as the president of the South Indian Cinematographers Association. Sundaram has also directed a few films including seven in Malayalam. Kolilakkam is one of his best known films in Malayalam. Jayan, who was the lead actor in the film, died in a helicopter accident during the shooting of its climax.

Sundaram won the Tamil Nadu State Film Award for Best Cinematographer for his work in the 1968 film Uyarndha Manidhan, and many other accolades, including awards from Jayalalithaa, actor and former chief minister of Tamil Nadu.

Some of his most notable works include Uyarndha Manithan, Thanga Pathakkam, Vietnam Veedu, among many others. He has also worked with veteran actors and directors like Jayan, M. G. Ramachandran, Sivaji Ganesan, Sridevi, P. Madhavan and Kamal Haasan.

Selected filmography
Uyarndha Manithan (1968)
Vietnam Veedu (1970)
Thanga Pathakkam (1974)
Ayodhya (1975 film) 
Aayiram Janmangal (1976)
Aparadhi (1977 film) 
Kolilakkam (1981)
Kakka  (1982)
Prathijnja  (1983)

References

External links
 

Tamil film cinematographers
Malayalam film cinematographers
Telugu film cinematographers
Cinematographers from Tamil Nadu
Malayalam film directors
1927 births
2010 deaths
20th-century Indian film directors
Film directors from Chennai
20th-century Indian photographers